Seok-ho, also spelled Suk-ho, is a Korean masculine given name. Its meaning differs based on the hanja used to write each syllable of the name. There are 20 hanja with the reading "seok" and 49 hanja with the reading "ho" on the South Korean government's official list of hanja which may be registered for use in given names.

People with this name include:
Yoon Seok-ho (born 1957), South Korean television director
Hur Suk-ho (born 1973), South Korean golfer
David Chang (Korean name Chang Seok-ho; born 1977), American chef and entrepreneur of Korean descent
Ahn Seok-ho (born 1986), South Korean football player
Hwang Seok-ho (born 1989), South Korean football player

See also
List of Korean given names

References

Korean masculine given names